Cláudia Cepeda (born 1967) is an erotic (as distinct from pornographic) Brazilian actress, mostly known for playing the role of "O" in the 1992 Brazilian erotic series História de O.

Filmography
 1994 Você Decide (TV series)  – Sombras do Passado
 1992 História de O Story of O, the Series (TV series) as title character
 1991 Manobra Radical 
 1990 Gente Fina (TV series) – Episode #1.1 - Gilda
 1989 Pacto de Sangue (TV series) – Episode dated 8 May 1989 (1989) - Angélica
 1988 Prisoner of Rio - Girl in Car

References

External links
 

Brazilian film actresses
Brazilian people of Spanish descent
Living people
1967 births